The 1980 Royal Tru-Orange season was the sixth season of the franchise in the Philippine Basketball Association (PBA). Beginning the Third Conference, the ballclub will be known as San Miguel Beermen, a beer brand long been used by the company in the MICAA will finally makes its debut in the PBA.

Transactions

Summary
The defending champions bring back Otto Moore as their import in the Open Conference along with Bubba Wilson, a one-time backcourt man of the Golden State Warriors in the NBA. The Orangemen lost their first game to U-Tex but pick up their first win of the season four days after against Toyota Tamaraws, 93-84 on March 22.  RTO ends up last in the conference and tied with Tanduay at the bottom of the standings after 18 games in the eliminations. 

San Miguel advances in the round of six of the All-Filipino Conference and the Beermen lost all their five assignments in the quarterfinal phase of the tournament.

Won-loss record vs Opponents

Roster

References

External links
 1980 RTO team photos@interbasket.net

San Miguel Beermen seasons
Royal